Stubble Trouble is a 2000 animated short film, produced under Calabash Animation and was directed by Joseph E. Merideth, a former animator for Calabash and a teacher of animation for The School of the Art Institute of Chicago and Columbia College Chicago.

Plot
The short is about a caveman who tries to impress a woman, however is rejected repeatedly by the woman due to his inability to keep a shaven face. The caveman attempts to shave his face using several items, including a sharp knife and a stone wheel. However, after shaving off his beard, the stubble grows back instantly.

Awards

Stubble Trouble was nominated for "Best Animated Short Film" in 2001 in the Academy Awards.

References

External links
 

2000 films
2000 animated films
2000 short films
2000s animated short films
American animated short films
Films about cavemen
2000s American films